Yorkville is a city in Gibson County, Tennessee. The population was 286 at the 2010 census.

Geography
Yorkville is located at  (36.098738, -89.119021).

Demographics

As of the census of 2000, there were 293 people, 116 households, and 88 families residing in the city. The population density was 206.4 people per square mile (79.7/km2). There were 125 housing units at an average density of 88.1 per square mile (34.0/km2). The racial makeup of the city was 99.66% White and 0.34% Native American. Hispanic or Latino of any race were 0.34% of the population.

There were 116 households, out of which 33.6% had children under the age of 18 living with them, 62.1% were married couples living together, 10.3% had a female householder with no husband present, and 23.3% were non-families. 20.7% of all households were made up of individuals, and 13.8% had someone living alone who was 65 years of age or older. The average household size was 2.53 and the average family size was 2.90.

In the city, the population was spread out, with 25.3% under the age of 18, 4.4% from 18 to 24, 31.1% from 25 to 44, 17.4% from 45 to 64, and 21.8% who were 65 years of age or older. The median age was 39 years. For every 100 females, there were 92.8 males. For every 100 females age 18 and over, there were 88.8 males.

The median income for a household in the city was $26,111, and the median income for a family was $37,813. Males had a median income of $28,125 versus $21,250 for females. The per capita income for the city was $13,805. About 3.4% of families and 9.2% of the population were below the poverty line, including 14.7% of those under the age of eighteen and 15.1% of those 65 or over.

Notable people 
Edward "Ed" Jones, represented Tennessee in the U.S. House of Representatives from 1969 to 1989; born in Yorkville

Media
Radio Stations
 WWGY 99.3  "Today's Best Music with Ace & TJ in the Morning"
 WTPR-AM 710 "The Greatest Hits of All Time"

History

John C. Kuykendall, from York District, South Carolina, first settled on the site in 1830, building a home and a store. Other settlers arrived shortly thereafter.  By 1850 Yorkville was incorporated, with W.H. Miller as its first mayor.

The Yorkville Hotel opened in 1840, and a flour mill and cotton gin were operating in Yorkville by 1870.

Churches
The town has three churches: Yorkville Cumberland Presbyterian Church, Bethel Baptist Church and the Yorkville Church of Christ.

References

Cities in Tennessee
Cities in Gibson County, Tennessee